[24]7.ai (full company name [24]7.ai, Inc.) is a customer service software and services company based in California that uses artificial intelligence and machine learning to provide targeted customer service.

History 
[24]7.ai was founded in April 2000 by P. V. Kannan and Shanmugam Nagarajan. Kannan previously founded Continuum Global Solutions, a software company, which was acquired by Kana Software in 1999.  

In 2003, [24]7.ai was privately funded in part by Michael Moritz and his venture capital firm Sequoia Capital. The total venture funding was estimated at $22 million. The company was profitable by the end of 2003.

In February 2012 a deal was announced in which [24]7.ai and Microsoft would combine technologies for natural user interfaces (NUIs) and data analytics at cloud scale. Microsoft made an equity investor and transferred approximately 400 employees of the former Tellme Networks to [24]7.ai. At the same time, [24]7.ai acquired the call center automation developer Voxify, which had been based in Alameda, California, and was funded by investors such as Intel. In 2012, the company rebranded its business, adopting a new logo dropping the word "Customer" and putting square brackets around the "24". In January 2013 it announced it would market some internally developed software products for combining chat with analytics.

In May 2013 the company announced the acquisition of social commerce firm Shopalize for an undisclosed amount of money. [24]7.ai was also listed on Forbes list of America's Most Promising Companies in 2013.

In November 2014, [24]7.ai acquired IntelliResponse, a provider of digital self-service technology, including virtual agent solutions.

In August 2015, [24]7.ai acquired Campanja, a Search Engine bidding platform with offices in Stockholm, London, Palo Alto, Chicago and New York, adding realtime marketing capability to the [24]7.ai offering.

In July 2015, the company announced it had become "the world's largest provider of chat agents, with more than 5,000 dedicated chat agents operating in its contact centers."

In October 2017, the company announced a name change, adding .ai to reflect the company's use of artificial intelligence.

Corporate affairs

Structure 
The company is headquartered in San Jose, California. Other offices are located in Toronto, London, and Sydney. [24]7.ai has customers in many industries, including agencies, education, financial services, healthcare, insurance, retail & e-commerce, telecom, travel and hospitality, and utilities.

The company's contact centers were originally located in Bangalore and Hyderabad, India, and in the Philippines. In 2007 (at about 7,000 total employees) the company expanded to Guatemala, Nicaragua, and Colombia to support Spanish-speaking customers.

Acquisitions 

 2015: Campanja, a Search Engine bidding platform
 2014: IntelliResponse, a provider of digital self-service technology, including virtual agent solutions
 2013: Shopalize, social commerce firm  
 2012: Voxify, call center automation developer

Products and services 
[24]7.ai offers sales and service-oriented software that provides services such as predictive analytics, and virtual agents. It integrates different channels of communication, including web chat, mobile devices and interactive voice response, which incorporates the company's proprietary language technology. 

The company operates contact centers that outsource voice and chat agent services, for sales and support. The main demands are in telecommunications, financial services, retail, insurance, and travel industries. Its early offerings were contact center services with voice contact center agents.

Controversies 

The company is reported to have monitored remote working employees via their web cameras. When the story came out, Klarna, a customer, required the practice to be stopped for any [24]7.ai employee working on their cases.

Recognitions 

 2013:America's Most Promising Companies 2013 (Forbes)

References 

Business process outsourcing companies
Companies based in Campbell, California
2000 establishments in California
Software companies based in California
Software companies of the United States